Pachypodium saundersii, the kudu lily, is a succulent plant of the family Apocynaceae. It was named in honour of Sir Charles James Renault Saunders (1857–1931), the Natal Province civil servant and casual plant collector.

It is found naturally in Southern Africa, on the Lebombo Mountains and other areas in KwaZulu-Natal, Mpumalanga and Eswatini (Swaziland).

It is usually a small, shrubby bush, but can grow up to 1.5m tall. The plant is covered in paired, sharp thorns, and dark green shiny leaves, and it flowers annually producing masses of white flowers that have a pinkish/purplish tinge to them.

References

saundersii
Flora of KwaZulu-Natal
Flora of the Northern Provinces
Flora of Swaziland
Succulent plants
Caudiciform plants
Taxa named by N. E. Brown